Avenue of Chestnut Trees at La Celle-Saint-Cloud or Edge of the Fontainebleau Forest is an 1865 pre-Impressionist painting by Alfred Sisley, produced in the woods at La Celle-Saint-Cloud. It was refused by the Paris Salon of 1867 and bought by Jean-Baptiste Faure in 1877. It was acquired in 1919 by Joseph Duveen, who in 1921 gave it to the Petit Palais, where it still hangs.

References 

Landscape paintings
Paintings by Alfred Sisley
1865 paintings
Paintings in the collection of the Petit Palais